Robert Allen Goldwin (1922 – January 12, 2010) was an American political scientist specializing in the study of the Constitution, who left academia to enter government at the invitation of his friend Donald Rumsfeld, serving as adviser and "intellectual-in-residence" for the presidential administration of Gerald Ford. He was subsequently a scholar at the American Enterprise Institute.

Early life and education
Goldwin was born in New York City to restaurateurs, and served in the United States Army during World War II. He performed undergraduate studies at St. John's College in Annapolis, Maryland, graduating in 1950.

Goldwin was a student of Leo Strauss at the University of Chicago, attaining his PhD in 1963 but continuing as lecturer there until 1966. It was there that he became friends with Donald Rumsfeld. He was awarded a Guggenheim Fellowship in 1966, and he subsequently taught at Kenyon College in Ohio and became Dean at St. John's College.

Career
Goldwin entered government at the invitation of then United States Ambassador to NATO Donald Rumsfeld, working initially as a special adviser. When Rumsfeld became White House Chief of Staff, Goldwin followed him. At the White House, Goldwin organized dinners with intellectuals for the president and conducted seminars in the solarium.

Following his time in government, Goldwin became a resident scholar at the American Enterprise Institute, where he wrote extensively on the constitution. He remained interested in current affairs, inviting political figures to seminars. He was credited by Rumsfeld with a significant contributions to ongoing public debates, including the Law of the Sea treaty and the drafting of a constitution for Iraq in 2003.

Bibliography
 From Parchment to Power, AEI Press, January 1998
 After the People Vote, AEI Press, March 1992
 The Spirit of the Constitution, AEI Press, July 1990
 Foreign Policy and the Constitution, AEI Press, March 1990.
 Why Blacks, Women, and Jews Are Not Mentioned in the Constitution, and Other Unorthodox Views, AEI Press, January 1990.
 Forging Unity out of Diversity, AEI Press, May 1989
 Constitution Makers on Constitution Making, Rowman & Littlefield, December 1988
 The Constitution, the Courts, and the Quest for Justice, AEI Press, December 1988
 Slavery and Its Consequences, AEI Press, August 1988
 Constitutional Controversies, AEI Press, December 1987
 How Does the Constitution Protect Religious Freedom? AEI Press, February 1987
 Separation of Powers, AEI Press, September 1986
 How Federal Is the Constitution? AEI Press, February 1986
 How Does the Constitution Secure Rights? AEI Press, January 1985
 How Capitalistic Is the Constitution? AEI Press, August 1982
 The Government's Role in Solving Societal Problems, Associated Faculty Press, Incorporated, January 1982
 Bureaucrats, Policy Analysts, Statesmen, AEI Press, January 1980
 How Democratic Is the Constitution? AEI Press, January 1980
 Political Parties in the 1980s, AEI Press, January 1980
 Beyond the Cold War, Ayer Co Pub, June 1979
 A Nation of States, Houghton Mifflin Company, May 1976
 Readings in Russian Foreign Policy, Oxford University Press, January 1970

References

External links
 

1922 births
2010 deaths
American political scientists
Ford administration personnel
University of Chicago alumni
St. John's College (Annapolis/Santa Fe) alumni
American Enterprise Institute
Kenyon College faculty
United States Army personnel of World War II